The 2021–22 season is Gokulam Kerala's fifth season since its establishment in 2017 and their fourth season in the I-League. In addition to the I-League, Gokulam Kerala will also participate in the Super Cup, Durand Cup, IFA Shield, and continental tournament AFC Cup.

First-team squad

New contracts

Transfers & loans

Transfers in

Loan in

Transfers out

Current technical staff

Pre-season

Competitions

Overview

I-League

League table

Results by round

Mathes 
I-league fixtures were published on 9 December 2021.

After the commencement of the first match-week of the league on 27 December 2021, the tournament got suspended on 29 December due to reports of numerous COVID-19 cases among the players and staff. All India Football Federation released new dates on 1 February 2022, with a revised schedule of the league resuming from 3 March.

Matches

Durand Cup

Group D

Quarter-final

IFA Shield

Group C
<onlyinclude>

Pre-Quarter Final

Quarter-final

Semi-final

AFC Cup

Gokulam Kerala FC will play in the AFC Cup Group Stage 2022 by virtue of a special dispensation awarded by the Asian Football Confederation (AFC).

Group D

Squad statistics

Appearances
Players with no appearances are not included on the list.

As of match played 24 May 2022

Goal Scorers

Assists
Not all goals have an assist.

Clean sheets

Disciplinary record

References

2021–22 I-League by team
Gokulam Kerala FC seasons
2021–22 in Indian football